Law & Order: Special Victims Unit (often abbreviated to Law & Order: SVU or just SVU) is an American crime drama television series created by Dick Wolf's own production company, Wolf Entertainment, for NBC. The first spin-off of Law & Order, it starred Christopher Meloni as Detective Elliot Stabler until Meloni left the series in 2011 after 12 seasons, and Mariska Hargitay as Detective (ultimately promoted to Captain) Olivia Benson, now the commanding officer of the Special Victims Unit after originally having been Stabler's partner in a fictionalized version of the New York City Police Department. Meloni reprised his role as Stabler in 2021 in the spin-off series Law & Order: Organized Crime. Law & Order: Special Victims Unit follows the style of the original Law & Order in that some episodes are loosely based on real crimes that have received media attention.

The show premiered on September 20, 1999. After the premiere of its 21st season in September 2019, the series became TV’s longest-running primetime U.S. live-action series in the history of television. Since the end of the original run of the main Law & Order series in 2010, SVU has been the only live-action primetime series that debuted in the 1990s that has remained in continuous production. As of October 21, 2021, Law & Order: Special Victims Unit has aired 500 original episodes, surpassing the episode count of the original Law & Order series. In terms of all-time episode count for a primetime scripted series, SVU now ranks fourth behind The Simpsons (with 728 episodes), Gunsmoke (with 635 episodes), and Lassie (with 591 episodes). In February 2020, the series was renewed through its 24th season. The 23rd season premiered on September 23, 2021, during which the show aired its milestone 500th episode. The 24th season premiered on September 22, 2022.

The series has received 91 award nominations, winning 33 awards. Mariska Hargitay was the first regular cast member on any Law & Order series to win an Emmy Award when she won the Primetime Emmy Award for Outstanding Lead Actress in a Drama Series in 2006.

Premise

Based out of the NYPD New York City Police Department's 16th precinct in Manhattan, Law & Order: Special Victims Unit delves into the dark side of the New York underworld as the detectives of a new elite force, the Special Victims Unit (SVU for short), investigate and prosecute various sexually oriented crimes, including rape, child sexual abuse and domestic violence. They also investigate the abuses of children, the disabled and elderly victims of non-sexual crimes who require specialist handling, all while trying to balance the effects of the investigation on their own lives as they try not to let the dark side of these crimes affect them. 

Its stories also touch on the political and societal issues associated with gender identity, sexual preferences, and equality rights. While the victim is often murdered, this is not always the case, and victims frequently play prominent roles in episodes. The unit also works with the Manhattan District Attorney's office as they prosecute cases and seek justice for SVU's victims and survivors with precision and a passion to win and bring closure to the intense investigations. The series often uses stories that are "ripped from the headlines" or based on real crimes. Such episodes take a real crime and fictionalize it by changing some details.

Originally, the show focused around the detective pairing of Elliot Stabler and Olivia Benson. Stabler is a seasoned veteran of the unit who has seen it all and tries his best to protect his family from the horrors he has seen in his career. Meanwhile, Benson's difficult past as the child of a rape victim is the reason she joined the unit. Backing them up are Detective John Munch and his first partner, Brian Cassidy. Munch is a transfer from Baltimore's homicide unit, who brings his acerbic wit, conspiracy theories, and street-honed investigative skills; Cassidy is young and eager to learn from his fellow detectives. 

These two detective teams received support from Detectives Monique Jeffries and Ken Briscoe.After thirteen episodes, Cassidy gets transferred to the narcotics division because of his inability to work well on the cases and the fact that they reminded him too much of his childhood abuse. As a result, Jeffries gets partnered up with Munch for the remainder of season one and Briscoe was phased out. 

In the beginning of season two, Jeffries leaves the unit following an incident with the Morris Commission and Munch get permanently partnered up with Detective Odafin "Fin" Tutuola, whose unique yet sometimes vulgar sense of humor and investigative experience make him a formidable match for Munch. 

Brooklyn SVU Detective Chester Lake would assist on several Manhattan cases during the eighth season and then join during season nine; Lake would then depart at the season's end after being arrested for murdering a crooked cop who had gotten away with rape. 

These detectives were supervised by veteran Captain Donald Cragen, who oversaw the team for seasons 1–15 and was previously the commanding officer of the homicide precinct in New York. Cragen's tough-but-supportive approach to the team's complex cases guides the squad through the challenges they face every day. 

Also assisting the Special Victims Unit, is FBI Special Agent Dr. George Huang who helps keep the officers sane in a field that could drive ordinary people mad, whilst also serving as the squad's resident criminal profiler, his insights into the criminal mind have often helped the officers to crack the toughest perps. The team also works with  Medical Examiner Dr. Melinda Warner, who has become an integral part of the unit, and her personal skills have contributed to the unit's high success rate in closing cases.

The unit did not receive a full-time assistant district attorney until season two, when Alexandra Cabot was assigned to work with the detectives. After Cabot enters the Witness Protection Program after almost being killed in a hit in season five, she was replaced by Casey Novak, who remained as the ADA until the end of season nine, when she was censured for violating due process while trying to bring a rapist cop to justice. Kim Greylek became the permanent ADA in the season ten premiere, until Cabot made a return midway through that season when Greylek returned to the Justice Department in Washington, D.C. Cabot remained the ADA through the second half of season 11. 

After Cabot's departure, the ADA void was filled by Sonya Paxton (Christine Lahti) and Jo Marlowe (Sharon Stone) until the conclusion of season 11. Gillian Hardwicke (Melissa Sagemiller) served as the SVU's ADA during season 12, while Novak would return for a guest appearance after completing her suspension near the end of the season. Paxton would also return for one more appearance in the season, during which she is brutally murdered by a rapist/murderer, but manages to leave behind vital evidence to assure his conviction. In season 13, both Cabot and Novak returned as ADAs. From the beginning of season 14, ADA Rafael Barba was SVU's prosecutor, until leaving halfway through season 19 following the death of an infant. 

"Chicago Justice"s Peter Stone became SVU's ADA after Chicago Justice was canceled after only one season. At the end of season 20, Stone decided to leave due to some of the cases being too much for him to handle. From there, former SVU Detective Dominick Carisi Jr. takes his place at the start of season 21.

In season 13, other big changes happened with Stabler having retired in the aftermath of the season 12 finale, until he reappeared in season 22, which led him to join NYPD's Organized Crime Control Bureau. Huang also departed at the same time after being reassigned to Oklahoma City, but has returned for occasional guest appearances. Detectives Nick Amaro and Amanda Rollins joined the team filling the void left by Stabler. Amaro brought empathy to his cases while dealing with a stressful home life, while Rollins had dogged persistence and instincts help her close cases, but also secrets from her past that could derail her career. 

During season 15, both Munch and Cragen retired from the NYPD, leaving Benson, after being promoted to Sergeant, to take control of the unit; she would later be promoted to Lieutenant at the start of season 17 and then Captain at the start of season 21. Season 16 was another period of change with the introduction of Carisi at the beginning and the departure of Amaro at the end. Also introduced in season 16 was Deputy Chief William Dodds, who served as commanding officer for the Special Victims Units in all five boroughs of New York. Dodds' son Mike transfers into Special Victims as Sergeant in season 17, becoming Benson's second-in-command until his death at the end of the season; Fin later passes the Sergeant's exam during season 18 and is officially promoted in Mike's place in season 19. 

Following Carisi's move to the DA's office in season 21, Vice Officer Katriona "Kat" Tamin joined the team after assisting on several cases, eventually getting promoted to detective. Dodds also departed the series at the start of the season due to some issues in the case regarding a mogul raping countless women, allowing new deputy chief Christian Garland to take his place. At the start of season 23, Tamin and Garland both resigned from the NYPD after becoming disillusioned with the legal system's failures and the systematic bias within the department, with Tamin being replaced by Detective Joe Velasco. Chief Tommy McGrath took over Garland's position until he could find a permanent deputy chief for SVU. 

At the beginning of season 24, Detective Grace Muncy joins SVU after solving a case that involves a teenage Dominican gang, while Rollins resigns from SVU halfway through the season after accepting an offer from Carisi's old colleague to teach at Fordham University.

Cast and characters

Production

Development

The idea for Law & Order: Special Victims Unit originated with the 1986 "preppie murder" case of Robert Chambers, who strangled and killed a woman he dated, Jennifer Levin, during what he claimed was consensual "rough sex" in Manhattan's Central Park. The crime inspired Dick Wolf to write the story for the season one episode of Law & Order titled "Kiss the Girls and Make Them Die". After writing the episode, Wolf wanted to go deeper into the psychology of crimes to examine the role of human sexuality.

The original title of the show was Sex Crimes. Initially, there was concern among the producers that, should Sex Crimes fail, identifying the new show with the Law & Order franchise could affect the original show. Additionally, Ted Kotcheff wanted to create a new series that was not dependent upon the original series for success. Wolf felt, however, that it was important and commercially desirable to have "Law & Order" in the title, and he initially proposed the title of the show be Law & Order: Sex Crimes. Barry Diller, then head of Studios USA, was concerned about the title, however, and it was changed to Law & Order: Special Victims Unit to reflect the actual unit of the New York City Police Department (NYPD) that handles sexually-based offenses.

Executive producer Neal Baer left Law & Order: SVU as showrunner at the end of season twelve, after eleven years (seasons 2–12) on the show, in order to sign a three-year deal with CBS Studios. Baer was replaced by former Law & Order: Criminal Intent showrunner Warren Leight. In March 2015, it was announced that Warren Leight signed a three-year deal with Sony Pictures Television, that will allow him to work on SVU one more season, its seventeenth. It was announced on March 10, 2016, that original Law & Order veteran producer Rick Eid would take Leight's place as showrunner starting in season 18. Creator Dick Wolf commented to The Hollywood Reporter, "I'm extremely pleased that Rick had decided to rejoin the family and hope that he will be here for years to come." During post-production of season 18, following the announcement that SVU was renewed for a nineteenth season, it was revealed that Rick Eid departed the series. He will be taking over another Dick Wolf/NBC series, Chicago P.D.

It was announced on May 25, 2017, that original Law & Order and Law & Order: Criminal Intent showrunner Michael S. Chernuchin would be reprising his role starting on season nineteen. Chernuchin was also co-creator and executive producing showrunner of Chicago Justice, another Wolf-related show that was canceled by NBC at the end of the 2016–17 TV season. On April 22, 2019, it was announced that Leight would return as showrunner for the series' twenty-first season. On May 3, 2022, Leight announced that he would not be returning for the twenty-fourth season.

Casting

Casting for the lead characters of Law & Order: Special Victims Unit occurred in the spring of 1999. Dick Wolf, along with officials from NBC and Studios USA were at the final auditions for the two leads at Rockefeller Center. The last round had been narrowed down to seven finalists. For the female lead, Detective Olivia Benson, actresses Samantha Mathis, Reiko Aylesworth, and Mariska Hargitay were being considered. For the male role, Detective Elliot Stabler, the finalists were Tim Matheson, John Slattery, Nick Chinlund, and Christopher Meloni. Hargitay and Meloni had auditioned in the final round together and, after the actors left, there was a moment of dead silence, after which Wolf blurted out, "Oh well. There's no doubt who we should choose—Hargitay and Meloni." Wolf believed the duo had the perfect chemistry together from the first time he saw them together, and they ended up being his first choice. Garth Ancier, then head of NBC Entertainment, agreed, and the rest of the panel assembled began voicing their assent.

The first actor to be cast for the show was Dann Florek. Florek had originated the character of Captain Don Cragen in the 1990 pilot for Law & Order, and played the character for the show's first three seasons until he was fired on the orders of network executives, who wanted to add female characters to the all-male primary cast, but he maintained a friendly relationship with Wolf, and went on to direct three episodes of the original series as well as to occasionally guest star on the show. Shortly after Florek reprised his role for Exiled: A Law & Order Movie, he received a call to be on Sex Crimes. Initially reluctant, he eventually agreed to star on the show as Cragen on the assurance that he would not be asked to audition for the role.

Shortly after the cancellation of Homicide: Life on the Street, Richard Belzer heard that Benjamin Bratt had left Law & Order. Belzer requested his manager to call Wolf and pitch the idea for Belzer's character from Homicide, Detective John Munch, to become the new partner of Jerry Orbach's character, Detective Lennie Briscoe, since they had previously teamed in three Homicide crossovers. Wolf loved the idea, but had already cast Jesse L. Martin as Briscoe's new partner, Detective Ed Green. The idea was reconfigured, but to have Munch on Law & Order: Special Victims Unit instead. Since the character of Munch was inspired by David Simon's depiction of Detective Sergeant Jay Landsman and developed for Homicide by Tom Fontana and Barry Levinson, the addition of Munch to the cast required the consent of all three. The appropriate agreements were reached and, while Fontana and Levinson agreed to waive their royalty rights, contracts with Simon required that he be paid royalties for any new show in which Munch is a main character; as a result, Simon receives royalties every time Munch appears in an episode of the show.

Dean Winters was cast as Munch's partner, Brian Cassidy, at the insistence of Belzer. Belzer looked at Winters as a sort of little brother, and told Wolf, "Well, I'll do this new show of yours, SVU, only if you make Dean Winters my partner." Wolf did make Winters Belzer's partner, but he was contractually obligated to his other show at the time, the HBO drama Oz. Since the role on Law & Order: Special Victims Unit was only initially meant to be a few episodes, Winters was forced to leave when it was time to film Oz again. Winters returned for the season 13 finale, "Rhodium Nights", reprising his role as Cassidy. He also appeared (as Cassidy) on the two-part season 14 premiere "Lost Reputation"/"Above Suspicion". He subsequently became a recurring character into season 15. The void left by Winters's departure was filled for the remainder of the season by Michelle Hurd as Detective Monique Jeffries, a character who Wolf promised that, despite starting out as a minor character with one scene in the pilot, would eventually develop. Hurd left the show at the beginning of season two to join the cast of Leap Years. Munch's permanent partner came in the form of rapper-turned-actor Ice-T, who had previously worked with Wolf on New York Undercover and Exiled. Ice-T originally agreed to do only four episodes of Law & Order: Special Victims Unit, but he quickly gained affection for the ensemble nature of the cast. He relocated to New York City before his four-episode contract was up and remained with the show as Munch's permanent partner, Detective Odafin "Fin" Tutuola.

Initially, the show focused exclusively on the police work of the detectives in the Special Victims Unit of the 16th precinct, with members of the District Attorney's office occasionally appearing as guest roles crossing over from the original Law & Order. From season two onwards, the format was changed to be more faithful to the original Law & Order concept by including court cases. Stephanie March had little television experience before being cast on Law & Order: Special Victims Unit, nor did she watch much TV. Nevertheless, March was cast as Assistant District Attorney Alexandra Cabot at the beginning of season two but still believed that, due to the grim nature of the series, it would be short-lived. She stayed with the series for three seasons, however, and left when she believed she had reached the natural conclusion of the character's development. She would later reprise the character as a guest appearance in season six and as a regular character on the short-lived Wolf series, Conviction, where she was promised more to do. Diane Neal had previously guest-starred on Law & Order: Special Victims Unit in season three before being cast as Cabot's replacement, Casey Novak, in season five. Neal remained with the show through the end of season nine, after which she was replaced by Michaela McManus. March returned to the show in the tenth season (after McManus' departure from the cast) when Neal Baer proposed Cabot receive a character arc to revitalize the second part of the season, which would continue through season eleven.

Tamara Tunie was cast as medical examiner Melinda Warner in season two after working with Wolf previously on New York Undercover, Feds, and Law & Order. Warner was initially a recurring character but became a regular character in season seven, and Tunie was added to the opening credits at that time. When initially cast as Warner, Tunie was appearing as attorney Jessica Griffin on the CBS daytime soap opera As the World Turns. From 2000 to 2007 (and again briefly in 2009), she appeared on both series simultaneously. In 2002, she also appeared on the Fox espionage-themed drama series 24, in the recurring role of CTU Acting Director Alberta Green. BD Wong was asked to film four episodes as Dr. George Huang, a Federal Bureau of Investigation (FBI) forensic psychiatrist and criminal profiler on loan to the Special Victims Unit. After his four episodes, he was asked to stay on with the show.

After he starred in Bury My Heart at Wounded Knee and guest-starred as Detective Chester Lake in the eighth season, Wolf felt that Adam Beach would be a good addition to the cast and asked him to be a permanent member beginning with the ninth season. Although Beach felt the role was a "dream role", the character proved unpopular with fans who felt that he was designed to gradually write out either Richard Belzer or Ice-T. Feeling there were too many police characters on the show, Beach left the show after only one season. Michaela McManus was originally felt to be too young for the role of an Assistant District Attorney (ADA) before being cast as ADA Kim Greylek in the tenth season. McManus, months removed from a recurring role on One Tree Hill, remained with the series only half a season, however, before departing for unspecified reasons.

Paula Patton joined the cast as ADA Mikka Von. She replaced Stephanie March. However, Patton dropped out after one episode to film Mission: Impossible – Ghost Protocol, and was replaced by Melissa Sagemiller in the recurring role of ADA Gillian Hardwicke.

Before the end of season twelve, Mariska Hargitay asked for a lighter workload. As a way of writing her out of certain episodes, a plan to have her character promoted to a supervisory role was discussed. At the end of season twelve, Christopher Meloni departed the cast, unable to reach agreement on a new contract. Warren Leight became the new showrunner during this same year and signed on before he knew that Meloni would be leaving the cast. The second major departure to be announced in 2011 was that of BD Wong. On July 17, Wong announced on Twitter that, "I actually do not return for season 13, I am jumping to Awake! It's awesome!" Wong added, "I don't know if or when I'll be back on SVU! It was amazing to have such a cool job for 11 years and to be a real NY Actor." Wong reprised his role as Dr. Huang in season 13's episode "Father Dearest". 

In June 2011, it was announced that Kelli Giddish and Danny Pino would join the cast as new series regulars. Weeks later, it was announced that Stephanie March and Diane Neal would be reprising their roles as ADA Alexandra Cabot and ADA Casey Novak, respectively. The launch of season 13 was marked with a retooling of the show that Warren Leight referred to as "SVU 2.0". Changes that accompanied this included Tamara Tunie's being bumped from the main cast to a guest-starring role and recurring actor Joel de la Fuente's not appearing for the first time since 2002. Of the latter change, Warren Leight said, "those scenes [which featured Fuente] can be dry" and hired Gilbert Gottfried as a more comedic replacement. 

In season 14, Raúl Esparza joined the cast in a recurring capacity as ADA Rafael Barba and prior to the season 15 premiere, Esparza was promoted to a series regular. Also in season 15, Belzer departed the cast in the fifth episode, "Wonderland Story", in which Sgt. Munch retired from the NYPD and took a job in the DA's office as an investigator. Later in the season, Captain Cragen announced his departure from the NYPD, which made newly promoted Sgt. Benson the temporary squad commander. In leaving the cast, Florek ended a 400-episode run as Captain Cragen. In season 16, Peter Scanavino joined the series, first in a recurring role for episodes 1–3 and then was promoted to the main cast in episode 5, with Kelli Giddish, Danny Pino, Ice-T and Raúl Esparza. On May 20, 2015, it was revealed that Danny Pino would be leaving the cast after the season 16 finale "Surrendering Noah".

In August 2017, it was announced that Philip Winchester would recur in season 19 as ADA Peter Stone, his character from Chicago P.D. and Chicago Justice, who is the son of Benjamin Stone, the first ADA on the original Law & Order series. It was later also announced that Brooke Shields was enlisted to assume a major recurring role (Sheila Porter, maternal grandmother of Noah Porter-Benson, Olivia's adopted son) starting in season 19 of the long-running dramatic series. On February 7, 2018, Raúl Esparza left the series after six seasons. His role was taken over by Winchester. Upon being renewed for its twenty-first season, it was announced that Winchester would be departing the series after the twentieth season.

In March 2019, it was announced that the show would come back for season 21, making it the longest-running primetime U.S. live-action series in the history of television. On March 29, 2019, it was revealed that Winchester would not return for season 21. He tweeted the same day about his departure from the show. On May 16, 2019, the season finale aired and Winchester took to Twitter to thank the cast and crew for the send-off. After recurring for several episodes in season 21 as Vice Officer Katriona Tamin, Jamie Gray Hyder joined the cast as a regular, starting in episode 8.   On October 6, 2020, Demore Barnes, who had recurred throughout season 21 as new Deputy Chief Christian Garland, was upgraded to regular status for season 22.
On September 3, 2021, it was announced that Hyder and Barnes would both depart the series following the two-hour season 23 premiere. On October 13, 2021, Octavio Pisano, who had guest starred since the start of the season, was promoted to regular status. On August 24, 2022, it was announced that Kelli Giddish would leave the series during the first half of season 24. On November 10, 2022, Molly Burnett, who initially appeared in a recurring capacity for the first six episodes, was promoted to series regular beginning with the seventh episode.

Salaries
By season twelve, both Mariska Hargitay and Christopher Meloni had become among the highest-paid lead actors on a drama, with each earning nearly $400,000 per episode, a salary that TV Guide said was exceeded only by House's Hugh Laurie. During season sixteen, Hargitay was reported to be earning $450,000 per episode, or $10,350,000 per season. In season seventeen, her salary increased to $500,000 per episode.

Filming and location

Many exterior scenes of Law & Order: Special Victims Unit are filmed on location in New York City, Wolf's hometown, throughout all five of New York City's boroughs.  Fort Lee, New Jersey served as the filming location for Detective Elliot Stabler's residence in Queens, New York.

When searching for a place to film the interiors of the show, the producers found that there were no suitable studio spaces available in New York City. As a result, a space was chosen at NBC's Central Archives building in nearby North Bergen, New Jersey, which had sat empty for some time.  of stage area. The Archives building was used for police station and courtroom scenes, with various other locations in Hudson County used for other scenes, such as a scene shot at the Meadowlands Parkway in Secaucus in 2010. The production left New Jersey for New York in 2010, however, when New Jersey Governor Chris Christie suspended the tax credits for film and television production for the Fiscal Year 2011 to close budget gaps. The show moved into the studio space at Chelsea Piers that had been occupied by the original Law & Order series until its cancellation in May 2010.

Episodes

N.B.: Episode counts for seasons 9, 21 and 22 were reduced due to the 2007–08 Writers Guild of America strike (Season 9) and the COVID-19 pandemic (Seasons 21 and 22).

Release

Broadcast
Law & Order: SVU airs on NBC in the United States. With the season eleven premiere on September 23, 2009, the series vacated its Tuesday 10 p.m. ET slot because NBC began a prime-time weeknight Jay Leno series. The new time slot became Wednesday nights at 9:00 p.m. ET on NBC, with CTV still airing SVU on Tuesdays at 10:00 in Canada. After the 2010 Winter Olympics on March 3, 2010, the time slot for SVU changed again to Wednesdays at 10 p.m. ET, where it stayed until the twelfth season. In the 12th season, SVU moved back to 9:00 p.m. to lead in the newest Law & Order spin-off, Law & Order: LA, until it was pulled from the network in January 2011 to be retooled. SVU moved back to 10:00 p.m. on January 12, 2011, until the end of the 13th season. With season 14, SVU moved back to 9:00 p.m. after a two-hour season premiere event on September 26, 2012. Beginning with Season 20, SVU would air on Thursday nights at 10 p.m., after NBC decided to devote their entire Wednesday primetime lineup to the Chicago Med, PD, and Fire trilogy. It marked the first time ever that Law & Order: SVU would hold this timeslot on Thursday nights. Starting with season 22, the show moved to 9 p.m., with offshoot Law & Order: Organized Crime taking its old slot.

From season 21 Law & Order: Special Victims Unit airs on Sky Witness in the United Kingdom.

Streaming
All seasons, including the season that is currently on the air, are available to stream on Hulu (with a subscription). The latest 5 episodes can be watched for free on NBC.com and the NBC app. Outside of SVOD and NBC platforms, most episodes (outside of seasons 2–4 in the United States for unknown reasons) can be found on electronic sell-through platforms such as iTunes and Amazon Prime Video. The series is available for streaming on Peacock along with Chicago Fire, Chicago P.D., Chicago Med, Law & Order and Law & Order: Criminal Intent. The first thirteen seasons are available for streaming in Australia on Amazon Prime Video. In Brazil, seasons 11 to 13 are available on Amazon Prime Video, and all 22 seasons are available on Globoplay, although seasons 15 to 22 require a subscription expansion or cable access to UniversalTV

Syndication
As of September 2017, the series is rerun on fellow NBCUniversal network USA, as well as local stations Ion Television and MyNetworkTV. The series also briefly ran on Syfy in 2006. In 2008, Fox obtained rights to air Law & Order: SVU on Fox-owned TV stations, and began doing so in the fall of 2009.

Reception

Ratings

In 2016, a New York Times study of the 50 TV shows with the most Facebook likes found that SVUs popularity was "atypical: generally slightly more popular in rural areas and the South, but largely restricted to the eastern half of the country. It is most popular in Albany, N.Y.; least in Colorado and Utah".

Awards and honors

Law & Order: Special Victims Unit has received many awards and award nominations. Mariska Hargitay has twice been nominated for a Golden Globe Award and won once in 2005.

The show has been nominated numerous times for the Emmy Award. Mariska Hargitay has been nominated for the Outstanding Lead Actress in a Drama Series category 8 years in a row beginning in 2004 and won the Emmy in 2006. Christopher Meloni was nominated for the Outstanding Lead Actor in a Drama Series category in 2006. Robin Williams was nominated in the Outstanding Guest Actor in a Drama Series in 2008. The series was nominated in the category Outstanding Guest Actress in a Drama Series for Jane Alexander and Tracy Pollan in 2000, Martha Plimpton in 2002, Barbara Barrie in 2003, Mare Winningham and Marlee Matlin in 2004, Amanda Plummer and Angela Lansbury in 2005, Marcia Gay Harden and Leslie Caron in 2007, Cynthia Nixon in 2008, Ellen Burstyn, Brenda Blethyn, and Carol Burnett in 2009, and Ann-Margret in 2010. The series won the award for Plummer in 2005, Caron in 2007, Nixon in 2008, Burstyn in 2009, and Margret in 2010.

Critical reception 
Law & Order: Special Victims Unit has been well received among critics. The show holds an average score of 88% on Rotten Tomatoes 
In 2014, Joshua Alston of The A.V. Club described it as "most improved, and that uptick in quality is all the more admirable. Ilana Kaplan of The New York Times wrote that the series the longest-running drama in primetime history and Mariska Hargitay as Olivia Benson is a person of repose of real life victims and survivors. Hargitay quoted: "It became very apparent to me early how much, culturally, we needed this character who relentlessly fights and advocates for women and for survivors, and who does it with compassion," she said through tears. "Somebody who is unequivocally committed to righting wrongs, who believes survivors, who's aware of the healing in it."

Criticism 

One researcher has condemned the show for casually portraying and dismissing civil rights violations, and for creating moral panic over who is accused of crime. In season five, the show also over-portrays Black perpetrators and offenders higher than real crime statistics: "Victims of color, particularly if they were associated with the lower or working class were more likely to be depicted as contributing to their offense...Furthermore, minority victims were more likely than their white counterparts to be shown only in a photograph and to remain nameless throughout the program. African American females were almost completely missing as rape victims on “SVU”, despite the fact that they are the group most at risk for sexual assault."

Some critics view the show as copaganda. It "serve[s] to legitimate and normalize civil rights violations and increase viewers confidence in the police because they usually protect citizens by apprehending offenders efficiently."

Russian adaptation
In 2007, the Russian production company Studio 2B purchased the rights to create an adaptation of Law & Order: Special Victims Unit for Russian television. Titled Law & Order: Division of Field Investigation, the series stars Alisa Bogart and Vica Fiorelia. It follows a unit of investigators in Moscow whose job is to investigate crimes of a sexual nature. The series aired on NTV until 2010 and was produced by Pavel Korchagin, Felix Kleiman and Edward Verzbovski and directed by Dmitry Brusnikin. The screenplays were written by Sergei Kuznvetsov, Elena Karavaeshnikova, and Maya Shapovalova.

Spin-off

On March 31, 2020, it was announced that NBC had ordered an untitled spin-off series to launch in the 2020–21 television season, with Christopher Meloni reprising his role as Elliot Stabler. Meloni left SVU in 2011. The series order consists of 13 episodes. On June 2, 2020, it was announced that the series would be called Law & Order: Organized Crime and writer Craig Gore had been fired. When NBC announced its fall schedule on June 16, Organized Crime was the only new show on the schedule, slotted for Thursdays at 10/9c. However, the series was later delayed to 2021. On October 2, 2020, it was announced that Matt Olmstead would be stepping down as showrunner and a replacement was not announced at the time. On December 9, 2020, it was announced that Ilene Chaiken has joined as showrunner after her overall deal with Universal Television. Dylan McDermott was announced on January 27, 2021, as joining the cast in an unspecified role. On February 2, 2021, Tamara Taylor was cast in an undisclosed role. On February 4, 2021, it was announced that the series would premiere on April 1, 2021, in a two-hour crossover event.

Explanatory notes

References

Citations

General and cited references

External links

  on Wolf Entertainment
  on NBC
 
 
 Law & Order: Special Victims Unit on Metacritic
 Law & Order: Special Victims Unit on Rotten Tomatoes
 
 Law & Order: Special Victims Unit on MyNetworkTV

 
1990s American crime drama television series
1990s American legal television series
1990s American LGBT-related drama television series
1990s American mystery television series
1990s American police procedural television series
1999 American television series debuts
2000s American crime drama television series
2000s American legal television series
2000s American LGBT-related drama television series
2000s American mystery television series
2000s American police procedural television series
2010s American crime drama television series
2010s American legal television series
2010s American LGBT-related drama television series
2010s American mystery television series
2010s American police procedural television series
2020s American crime drama television series
2020s American legal television series
2020s American LGBT-related drama television series
2020s American mystery television series
2020s American police procedural television series
Adultery in television
American crime drama television series
American legal drama television series
American television spin-offs
American thriller television series
Edgar Award-winning works
English-language television shows
Fictional portrayals of the New York City Police Department
Incest in television
Law & Order (franchise)
New York Supreme Court
Primetime Emmy Award-winning television series
Rape in television
Television Academy Honors winners
Television series about prosecutors
Television series based on actual events
Television series by Universal Television
Television series by Wolf Films
Television series created by Dick Wolf
Television shows featuring audio description
Television shows set in Manhattan
Television shows set in New York City
Transgender-related television shows